Oresbius is a genus of parasitoid wasps belonging to the family Ichneumonidae.

The species of this genus are found in Europe and Northern America.

Selected species
 Oresbius alpinophilus Sawoniewicz, 1993 
 Oresbius ambulator (Roman, 1909)

References

Ichneumonidae
Ichneumonidae genera